Paracuellos may refer to:

Places
 Paracuellos de Jarama;
 Paracuellos de Jiloca;
 Paracuellos de la Ribera;
 Paracuellos, Cuenca;
 Paracuellos massacres;

In fiction
 , comics by Carlos Giménez